Pash-e Olya (also Romanized as Pash-e ‘Olyā; also known as Bālā Pash and Pash) is a village in Deylaman Rural District, Deylaman District, Siahkal County, Gilan Province, Iran. At the 2006 census, its population was 54, in 17 families.

References 

Populated places in Siahkal County